Laurel Grove may refer to the following places in the United States:

 Laurel Grove, Oregon
 Laurel Grove, Pittsylvania County, Virginia
 Laurel Grove, Westmoreland County, Virginia

Laurel Grove was also the name of a Florida plantation of Zephaniah Kingsley and his wife Anna Kingsley.

See also 
 Laurel Grove Cemetery in Savannah, Georgia